Karan is a village in western Serbia, located in the municipality of Užice, in the Zlatibor District. According to the 2002 census, its population numbered 582. There is a 14th-century Serbian Orthodox church located in the village, called the White Church.

History

The village was established in the area of an earlier Roman settlement called Malvestatium.

The White Church in Karan was built in 1332 by local župan Petar Brajan, as a family funeral church. The church was erected on site of an older temple from 10th century, mentioned in charter edited by Byzantine Emperor Basil II in 1020. Inside there are portraits of Brajan and his family and of the Serbian Emperor Stefan Dušan.

See also
White Church, Karan
List of places in Serbia

Populated places in Zlatibor District